Tekom may refer to:
Tekom Municipality
Tekom Technologies
tekom Europe e.V., the European Association for Technical Communication